Glyphyalinia pecki is a species of air-breathing land snails, terrestrial pulmonate gastropod mollusks in the family Zonitidae. This species is endemic to the United States.

References

Molluscs of the United States
Glyphyalinia
Taxonomy articles created by Polbot